Jacques Louis Marie Henri Aymer de la Chevalerie (30 October 1872 – 16 September 1939) was a French fencer. He competed in the men's épée event at the 1900 Summer Olympics.

References

External links
 

1872 births
1939 deaths
French male épée fencers
Olympic fencers of France
Fencers at the 1900 Summer Olympics
Fencers from Paris